Max Steel: Dark Rival is a 2007 computer-animated science fiction action film based on the TV series and action figure line of the same name. It is the sequel to Max Steel: Countdown (2006) and the fourth film overall in the Max Steel direct-to-video film series.

A sequel, titled Max Steel: Bio Crisis, was released in October 2008.

Plot
Strange thefts of N-Tek property have Max Steel on the tail of a new super agent, Troy Winter, who claims to be superior to Max in every sense. The chase is on when Team Steel realize Troy's goal is to obtain a piece of a comet named Morphosos using the stolen N-Tek technology and deliver it into enemy hands. During a battle with Max, Troy falls into a volcano with a piece of the comet. The chemical reaction between the extreme heat and the comet's components transforms Troy into a sharped dark mineral crystal like creature, with the power of "extrude" other living being's life force and abilities. Troy then adopts the name of Extroyer and attacks N-Tek headquarters. In the middle of confusion, Elementor is once again released. Extremely weak, Elementor chases Extroyer seeking the comet fragments as a new source of power, but he is "extruded" and defeated. Troy takes 'Berto, Kat and Jefferson as hostages and forces Max to obey him. Extroyer uses N-Tek's stolen magnets powered by Max to redirect the comet Morphosos near earth, so he can take as much crystal fragments as he wants, but too late he realizes it is all a setup, and he's sent into deep space instead, stuck in the comet's surface.

Cast
 Christian Campbell as Max Steel
 Scott McNeil as Elementor, Jefferson Smith and a male tour guide
 Alessandro Juliani as 'Berto
 Lisa Ann Beley as Kat and the N-Tek computer voice
 Brian Drummond as Troy Winter/Extroyer and the nuclear plant computer voice
 David Kaye as Warren Hunter

External links
 Official site
 

2007 direct-to-video films
2007 animated films
Canadian direct-to-video films
American direct-to-video films
American animated science fiction films
Direct-to-video animated films
Films based on television series
Max Steel
Rainmaker Studios films
Films based on Mattel toys
2000s American animated films
2007 films
Films directed by William Lau
2000s Canadian films